Šljivovac may refer to:

 Šljivovac (Aerodrom), a village in Serbia
 Šljivovac (Malo Crniće), a village in Serbia
 Šljivovac, Croatia, a village in Croatia